Bécaye Diop (born 1945) is a Senegalese politician, who is a member of the Senegalese Democratic Party (PDS) and has held several ministerial positions.

Biography

In 2000, when President Abdoulaye Wade and the Senegalese Democratic Party came to power, he was named ministerial delegate for the ministry of education, in charge of vocational education, professional training, literacy and national languages.

On 6 November 2002, Bécaye Diop succeeded him as head of the Ministry of the Armed Forces. He retained this role in several successive cabinets (those of Idrissa Seck, Habib Thiam and Cheikh Hadjibou Soumaré). On this extraordinary longevity, he claimed, "The secret of my longevity in government is my loyalty to President Wade ... I have only one objective: to please Wade and to serve him in every way." During a minor reshuffle in 2007, he was also appointed Minister of State.

In October 2009, Abdoulaye Baldé succeeded him as head of the ministry and he was named Minister of the Interior, replacing Cheikh Tidiane Sy. He lost this position in April 2012, as a result of the victory of Macky Sall in the Presidential elections. Mbaye Ndiaye became the new Minister of the Interior.

In 2014, as part of the Benno Bokk Yaakaar coalition, he became mayor of the small town of Ross Béthio.

Bécaye Diop is married and has six children.

See also 

Politics of Senegal
Armed Forces of Senegal

References

Bibliography 
Babacar Ndiaye et Waly Ndiaye, Présidents et ministres de la République du Sénégal, Dakar, 2006 (2nd edition), pp. 161.

External links 
« Sept ans passés au gouvernement : Bécaye Diop livre le secret de sa longévité » (article Wal Fadjri, 9 July 2007 on Rewmi.com)
Short biography on the wibsite of the Ministry of Armed Forces

1945 births
Senegalese Democratic Party politicians
Defense ministers of Senegal
Interior ministers of Senegal
Military of Senegal
Living people